Hirmuküla (German: Hirmoküll) is a village in Mulgi Parish in Viljandi County in southern Estonia. It borders the villages Mäeküla, Sudiste, Karksi, Oti, Morna and Tuhalaane as well as Viljandi Parish. The name means village of fear in Estonian.

References

Villages in Viljandi County